"You're the Love" is a 1978 song recorded by Seals and Crofts. The song reached number 18 on the U.S. Billboard Hot 100, and in Canada it spent two weeks at number eight. The song was the act's final Top 40 hit in both nations.

It was a bigger Adult Contemporary hit, reaching number five in Canada, and number two in the U.S.

Chart performance

Weekly charts

Year-end charts

References

External links
 

1978 singles
Seals and Crofts songs
1978 songs
Warner Records singles
Songs written by David Batteau